The Democracy Video Challenge is an annual film contest featuring films under three minutes in length that complete the phrase "Democracy is…" It is part of a broader initiative called "Democracy is…" that seeks to use creative mediums to start a global discussion about the meaning of democracy. The contests use social media to foster that dialogue among people around the world.

The 2009 Video Challenge was first announced on September 15, 2008, International Day of Democracy. Richard Engel, NBC News chief foreign correspondent served as master of ceremonies for both the 2009  and 2010  contest launches. Since its launch, more than 1,600 people from 111 countries have entered the contest,  while nearly 3.5 million people have been engaged online.

Process 

Each year the Challenge honors one winner from each of six regions: Sub-Saharan Africa, East Asia and the Pacific, Europe, the Near East and North Africa, South and Central Asia, and the Western Hemisphere.

A jury selects 18 finalists – three videos from each of the six geographic regions.  The winners are then selected during a global online vote on YouTube. The six winning filmmakers receive an all-expense-paid trip to Washington, D.C., Hollywood and New York City to meet with professionals from entertainment, government, media and civil society.

Jury 

Years jurors participated are in parentheses. Jury co-chairs are noted with an asterisk.

 Michael Apted, President, Directors Guild of America (2009)*
 Hernando de Soto, President, Institute for Liberty and Democracy (2009, 2010)*
 Mitch Bainwol, Chairman & CEO, Recording Industry Association of America (2010)
 Michael Blieden, Member, Directors Guild of America (2009)
 Charles Burnett, Member, Directors Guild of America (2009)
 Mary Schmidt Campbell, Dean, New York University Tisch School of the Arts (2009, 2010)
 Kendra Carter, Director Diversity Talent Initiatives and Executive Lead on the Comedy Short Cuts Film Festival, NBC Universal (2010)
 Jay Chandrasekhar, Member, Directors Guild of America (2009)
 Tsering Choden, 2009 Democracy Video Challenge winner from South and Central Asia (2010)
 Jennifer Corriero, Executive Director and Co-Founder, TakingITGlobal (2009, 2010)
 Lorne W. Craner, President, International Republican Institute (2009, 2010)
 Richard Engel, Chief Foreign Affairs Correspondent, NBC News (2009, 2010)
 Lesli Linka Glatter, Member, Directors Guild of America (2009)
 Dan Glickman, President, Motion Picture Association of America (2009, 2010)
 Rodin Hamidi, 2009 Democracy Video Challenge winner from Near East (2010)
 Anna Israel, 2009 Democracy Video Challenge winner from Western Hemisphere (2010)
 Victoria Hochberg, Member, Directors Guild of America (2009)
 Norman Hollyn, Associate Professor, University of Southern California School of Cinematic Arts (2009)
 Jeremy Kagan, Professor, University of Southern California School of Cinematic Arts (2009)
 Rob Lieberman, Member, Directors Guild of America (2009)
 Aissa Peñafiel, 2009 Democracy Video Challenge winner from East Asia and Pacific (2010)
 Gina Prince-Bythewood, Member, Directors Guild of America (2009)
 William Reese, Chief Executive Officer, International Youth Foundation (2009, 2010)
 Luke Russert, Special Correspondent, NBC News (2009)
 Penelope Spheeris, Member, Directors Guild of America (2009)
 John Sullivan, Executive Director, Center for International Private Enterprise (2009, 2010)
 Lukasz Szozda, 2009 Democracy Video Challenge winner from Europe (2010)
 Chansa Tembo, 2009 Democracy Video Challenge winner from Africa (2010)
 Ernest J. Wilson III, Dean of Annenberg, University of Southern California Annenberg School for Communication & Journalism  (2010)
 Ken Wollack, President, National Democratic Institute (2009, 2010)

2009 Winners

2010 Winners

Spinoffs 

In January 2010 a Democracy is… Twitter contest was conducted. The contest received 1,400 entries with the winner determined by the entry with the greatest number of re-tweets.  The winner received a Flip HD video camera. 

On July 1, 2010 the first Democracy Photo Challenge was announced. Like the other challenges, participants will be asked to submit photos that complete the phrase "Democracy is…" The contest entry period is slated to run July 7–28, 2010.  The winners announced on the United Nations’ International Day of Democracy, September 15, 2010. The winning photographs exhibited at the UN headquarters in New York.  

Democracy Photo Challenge jury co-chairs include:

 Phil Borges, documentary photographer and founder of the nonprofit Bridges to Understanding
 Willis Hartshorn, Ehrenkranz director of the International Center of Photography 
 Louie Psihoyos, Academy Award-winning documentary director (“The Cove”), photographer and executive director of the Oceanic Preservation Society

Partners 

 Center for International Private Enterprise
 International Republican Institute
 International Youth Foundation
 Motion Picture Association of America
 National Democratic Institute
 NBC Universal
 New York University Tisch School of the Arts
 Recording Industry Association of America
 TakingITGlobal
 University of Southern California Annenberg School for Communication & Journalism
 U.S. Department of State 
 YouTube

Additional partners in the Democracy Photo Challenge include:

 The Annenberg Space for Photography
 Bridges to Understanding
 Getty Images
 International Center of Photography
 One Economy Corporation
 Picasa Web Albums

External links 
 Democracy Video Challenge website
 Democracy Video Challenge YouTube channel
 2010 winning videos
 2009 winning videos

References 

Internet film festivals